The 2018 Gander Outdoors 400 was a Monster Energy NASCAR Cup Series race held on October 7, 2018 at Dover International Speedway in Dover, Delaware. Contested over 404 laps—extended from 400 laps due to an overtime finish, on the one-mile (1.6 km) concrete speedway, it was the 30th race of the 2018 Monster Energy NASCAR Cup Series season, fourth race of the Playoffs, and the first race of the Round of 12.

Report

Background

Dover International Speedway (formerly Dover Downs International Speedway) is a race track in Dover, Delaware, United States. Since opening in 1969, it has held at least two NASCAR races. In addition to NASCAR, the track also hosted USAC and the Verizon IndyCar Series. The track features one layout, a  concrete oval, with 24° banking in the turns and 9° banking on the straights. The speedway is owned and operated by Dover Motorsports.

The track, nicknamed "The Monster Mile", was built in 1969 by Melvin Joseph of Melvin L. Joseph Construction Company, Inc., with an asphalt surface, but was replaced with concrete in 1995. Six years later in 2001, the track's capacity moved to 135,000 seats, making the track have the largest capacity of sports venue in the mid-Atlantic. In 2002, the name changed to Dover International Speedway from Dover Downs International Speedway after Dover Downs Gaming and Entertainment split, making Dover Motorsports. From 2007 to 2009, the speedway worked on an improvement project called "The Monster Makeover", which expanded facilities at the track and beautified the track. After the 2014 season, the track's capacity was reduced to 95,500 seats.

Entry list

First practice

Qualifying
Qualifying for Friday was cancelled due to rain and Kyle Busch, the point leader, was awarded the pole as a result.

Starting Lineup

Practice (post-qualifying)

Second practice
Second practice session scheduled for Saturday was cancelled due to rain.

Final practice

Race

Kyle Busch led the field to green, only to be passed by Kevin Harvick ten laps later. Harvick swept both stages. Harvick led until about 50 to go when he had a loose wheel. Aric Almirola inherited the lead from his mistake-cursed teammate. Almirola maintained the lead until a caution with ten to go, caused by a crashed SHR car of Clint Bowyer. Chase Elliott boldly opted not to pit, taking the lead. On the restart Elliott surfed ahead of Almirola, who would ultimately wreck with Brad Keselowski a half lap later, sending the race into overtime. At the restart, Elliott forged ahead of Denny Hamlin, a rival from Martinsville and Phoenix in 2017. Chase would go on to lock himself into the round of 8.

Stage Results

Stage 1
Laps: 120

Stage 2
Laps: 120

Final Stage Results

Stage 3
Laps: 160

Race statistics
 Lead changes: 8 among different drivers
 Cautions/Laps: 5 for 31
 Red flags: 1 for 4 minutes and 59 seconds
 Time of race: 3 hours, 18 minutes and 2 seconds
 Average speed:

Media

Television
NBC Sports covered the race on the television side. Rick Allen, 2006 race winner Jeff Burton, Steve Letarte and 2001 race winner Dale Earnhardt Jr. had the call in the booth for the race. Dave Burns, Marty Snider and Kelli Stavast reported from pit lane during the race.

Radio
MRN had the radio call for the race, which was simulcast on Sirius XM NASCAR Radio.

Standings after the race

Manufacturers' Championship standings

Note: Only the first 16 positions are included for the driver standings.

References

2018 in sports in Delaware
2018 Monster Energy NASCAR Cup Series
NASCAR races at Dover Motor Speedway
October 2018 sports events in the United States